Tripodichthys is a genus in the  tripod fish family (Triacanthidae) native to the Indian Ocean and the western Pacific Ocean.

Species
There are currently 3 recognized species in this genus:
 Tripodichthys angustifrons Hollard, 1854 (Black-flag tripodfish)
 Tripodichthys blochii Bleeker, 1852 (Long-tail tripodfish)
 Tripodichthys oxycephalus Bleeker, 1851 (Short-tail tripodfish)

References

Tetraodontiformes
Marine fish genera